All About Eve is a 1950 film starring Bette Davis and Anne Baxter.

All About Eve may also refer to:

Music 
 All About Eve (band), an English rock band
 All About Eve (album), the first album by the band
 All About Eve, a PJ Harvey album released in 2019, the score to a stage adaptation of the 1950 film
 "All About Eve", a song by Marxman
 "All About Eve", a song by Steve Vai from Fire Garden
 "All About Eve", a song by The Wedding Present from George Best

Television 
 All About Eve (South Korean TV series), a 2000 South Korean drama
 All About Eve (Philippine TV series), a 2009 adaptation of the Korean series
 "All About Eve", an episode of the American SF drama Earth 2
 "All About Eve", an episode of the American sitcom Eve
 "All About Eve", an episode of the American sitcom Last Man Standing 
 All About Eve, a 1994 TV documentary about Eve van Grafhorst
 "All About Eve" (Supergirl), an episode of Supergirl